Sirsa railway station is a main railway station in Sirsa district, Haryana, India. Its code is SSA. It serves Sirsa city. The station consists of two platforms. It lies on Hisar–Bathinda line.

Trains 

Trains originate/terminate at Sirsa are:

 14085/14086 Sirsa Express
 54632/54633 Sirsa–Ludhiana Passenger

Major train from Sirsa
14519/14520 Kisan Express 
19611/19612 Ajmer–Amritsar Express 
19415/19416 Ahmedabad–Shri Mata Vaishno Devi Katra Express

References 

Sirsa, Haryana
Railway stations in Sirsa district
Bikaner railway division
Railway stations in Haryana